Nirakarpur railway station is a railway station on the East Coast Railway network in the state of Odisha, India. It serves Nirakarpur village. Its code is NKP. It has four platforms. Passenger, MEMU, Express trains halt at Nirakarpur railway station.

Major trains

 East Coast Express
 Hirakhand Express
 Bhubaneshwar–Visakhapatnam Intercity Express
 Puri–Tirupati Express
 Rourkela–Gunupur Rajya Rani Express
 Visakha Express

See also
 Khordha district

Gallery

References

Railway stations in Khorda district
Khurda Road railway division